KKAX-LD is a low-power television station in Kingman, Arizona, licensed to Hilltop, an unincorporated area within Kingman. It is a YTA TV affiliate, and is locally owned by Tri-State Broadcasting, LLC, owned by Arizona State Mine Inspector Joe Hart and his wife Rhonda. KKAX-LD broadcasts on UHF channel 36 from its transmitter located on Hayden Peak, and serves Kingman, Golden Valley and surrounding area. The signal reaches Bullhead City and Mohave Valley, AZ via microwave link located on Black Mountain near Oatman, and is repeated on K23BJ-D in Lake Havasu City.

History
An original construction permit was granted on November 18, 1985 to Group Seven Communications of New York, New York. The initial callsign was designated as K36AX, to operate on channel 36. The station was to serve the Kingman area, although its city of license was to be Hilltop, and the transmitter was located on a bluff overlooking downtown Kingman. The station was licensed on August 25, 1987. Initial programming is unknown, but Group Seven Communications was recognized for its marketing emphasis toward the Hispanic community.

In September 2000, Group Seven Communications sold K36AX to Tri-State Broadcasting. In April 2002, the station moved to a new transmitter location on Getz Peak, increasing its signal coverage. And in the July 2002, the station unveiled new call letters, KKAX-LP, based on the old callsign – K K36AX. KKAX-LP moved once again in September 2003 to Hayden Peak in order to have a clear microwave path to feed its translators in the neighboring communities of Bullhead City and Lake Havasu.

The station was licensed for digital operation on August 27, 2021, changing its call sign to KKAX-LD.

Translator

References

External links
 webpage
 
 

KAX-LD
Television channels and stations established in 1987
1987 establishments in Arizona
Low-power television stations in the United States